RevoLOUtion: The Transformation of Lou Benedetti, also known as Revoloution, is a fictional dramedy co-written by Deer Hunter writer Quinn Redeker, with a theme by Rocky composer Bill Conti.

Directed, co-written by and starring Bret Carr, the film also features Burt Young, Starla Benford, Ernest Mingione, Freedom Williams, Suzanne Didonna, Jon Jacobs and Kumar Pallana.

Plot
RevoLOUtion is the fictional story of Lou, a stuttering ex-boxer who can only speak normally when starting trouble  protecting the Brooklyn neighborhood in which he lives. Lou transforms from violent, extreme stutterer into a great, powerful communicator.

Production and release
Carr shot additional scenes for the film every to two years since 1996, and having been rejected 5 years in a row from major film festivals, he eventually won or was nominated for Jury Prize and/or special distinctions at 14 of the top festivals such as Best Picture at Malibu Film Festival, Best Picture at San Francisco World Film Festival, Jury Prize Nomination at Slamdance Film Festival and others.

Quoting from Awareness Magazine, "the viewer so identifies with Carr's Oscar Caliber performance, that they are taken on a near death psychological journey with "Lou", and come out having had their own awakening."

Intent on reaching a wider audience, Vividas, the technology partners behind the documentary The Secret made RevoLOUtion their first dramatic film to be streamed online.

References

External links

2006 films
2006 comedy-drama films
American comedy-drama films
American independent films
2006 comedy films
2006 drama films
2006 independent films
Films set in Brooklyn
American boxing films
2000s English-language films
2000s American films